Stathmopoda triloba is a moth of the family Stathmopodidae first described by Edward Meyrick in 1913. It is found in Sri Lanka.

References

Moths of Asia
Moths described in 1913
Stathmopodidae